Contract With the World is a 1980 novel written by Canadian author Jane Rule.  The story takes place in Vancouver, British Columbia, in the mid-1970s, and is divided in six parts, each focusing on the perspective of a different character.  Themes of artistic motivation, personal fulfilment, and sexual politics are present throughout.

Characters
The six primary characters to which each a chapter is devoted are: Joseph (walker), Mike (sculptor), Alma (story writer), Roxanne (recording artist), Allen (photographer/"mourner"), and Carlotta (a painter)

1980 Canadian novels
Novels by Jane Rule
Novels set in Vancouver
Novels about artists
Novels about writers
Novels set in the 1970s